ICAC Investigators is a long-running family of Hong Kong television miniseries about the work of Hong Kong's Independent Commission Against Corruption (ICAC). The series are public awareness films produced by Radio Television Hong Kong or Television Broadcasts Limited, with the full co-operation of the ICAC itself. Each series dramatises real cases of the Commission and serves both to educate the populace against corrupt practises and as a public relations tool for the ICAC.

History
The series have been part of ICAC's history since its infancy the first series of 13 episodes airing on Rediffusion Television in 1975. Corruption in Hong Kong at that time was endemic and pervaded all walks of life. Presenting its message in a cops and robbers dramatised form proved far more effective at delivering the message, that bribes and kickbacks were unacceptable, than just lecturing the populace.

Series
Although usually produced by RTHK the series are usually aired by TVB, but also in the past Asia Television, since RTHK does not broadcast its own programs. The series usually consist of multiple stories, each usually told over the course of a single episode, based on real cases and take the form of a police procedural. The first installments of the series were broadcast under a variety different names with ICAC Investigators being the most recent and common name.